The canton of Poissy is an administrative division of the Yvelines department, northern France. It was created at the French canton reorganisation which came into effect in March 2015. Its seat is in Poissy.

Composition

It consists of the following communes:
Achères
Carrières-sous-Poissy
Poissy

Councillors

Pictures of the canton

References

Cantons of Yvelines